Bukovec is a village and municipality in Myjava District in the Trenčín Region of north-western Slovakia.

History
In historical records the village was first mentioned in 1609.

Geography
The municipality lies at an altitude of 380 metres and covers an area of 15.469 km2. It has a population of about 415 people.

Genealogical resources

The records for genealogical research are available at the state archive "Statny Archiv in Bratislava, Slovakia"

 Roman Catholic church records (births/marriages/deaths): 1730-1952 (parish B)
 Lutheran church records (births/marriages/deaths): 1733-1949 (parish A)

See also
 List of municipalities and towns in Slovakia

References

External links
 
 
https://web.archive.org/web/20071217080336/http://www.statistics.sk/mosmis/eng/run.html
Surnames of living people in Bukovec

Villages and municipalities in Myjava District